Pogrebinsky (also spelled Pogrebinski, Pogrebinskii, and Pogrebinskiy) is a surname of Slavic language origin. The earliest record of "Pogrebinsky" comes from Ukraine. The surname may derive from a place of origin or refer to someone who worked at a graveyard or was involved in burials. In Slavic languages, the prefix "po" indicates "by" or "near" while "grob" may refer to a grave, casket, or cellar.

People with the surname
Alexander Pogrebinsky, American painter
Elliana Pogrebinsky, American ice dancer
Matvei Pogrebinsky, Russian revolutionary

Ukrainian-language surnames